Ruth Ann Minner (née Coverdale; January 17, 1935 – November 4, 2021) was an American politician and businesswoman from Milford, in Kent County, Delaware. A member of the Democratic Party, she served as the 72nd (and, to date, only female) governor of Delaware from 2001 to 2009. She previously served in the Delaware House of Representatives from 1975 to 1983, in the Delaware Senate from 1983 to 1993, and as 23rd lieutenant governor of Delaware from 1993 to 2001.

Early life and education
Ruth Ann Coverdale was born on January 17, 1935, in Milford, Delaware. While growing up, she left high school at age 16 to help support her family. Subsequently, she married Frank Ingram with whom she had three children: Frank Jr., Wayne, and Gary. When she was 32 her husband died suddenly of a heart attack in 1967, leaving her a single mother with three children. She earned her GED in 1968 and later attended Delaware Technical and Community College, while working two jobs to support the family. In 1969 she married Roger Minner and they operated a family towing business, the Roger Minner Wrecker Service. Roger Minner died of lung cancer in 1991.

Professional and political career
Minner began her political career as a clerk in the Delaware House of Representatives and as a receptionist in the office of Governor Sherman W. Tribbitt. In 1974 she was elected to the State House as a member of the "Watergate Class," a group of newly elected legislators from both parties, who came into office on a "good government" mission and a strong sense of their ability to make significant improvements. Minner rose to become Delaware's most powerful female politician, but she did it in a very conventional way, representing a rural, small town constituency, and building relationships and expertise by working in the legislative process over many years. She served four terms in the State House, from the 1975/1976 session through the 1981/82 session.

At various times she served as House Majority Whip and chair of the powerful Bond Bill Committee. She also chaired the Rules Committee. In that role she led several successful reforming efforts, including a change that removed the rule allowing Representatives to table roll call votes. This rule was used to help schedule votes when only the right combinations of Representatives were on the floor.

In 1982 Minner was elected to the Delaware Senate and served there from the 1983/1984 session through the 1991/1992 session. While in the State Senate Minner sponsored the Delaware Land and Water Conservation Act, a key piece of legislation that protected 30,000 acres (120 km²) of land and created the Delaware Open Space Council. To fund the activities of this Council the General Assembly created the "Twenty-First Century Fund" from the proceeds of a multimillion-dollar corporate securities lawsuit. Elected Lieutenant Governor in 1992, she served two terms from January 19, 1993, to January 3, 2001. While in that position she chaired the Minner Commission on Government Reorganization and Effectiveness.

Governor of Delaware

Minner was elected Governor of Delaware on November 7, 2000. She had secured the Democratic nomination after her long years in the General Assembly, as Lieutenant Governor and her demonstrated ability to run a campaign by her large statewide victory margins in 1992 and 1996. Her opponent in 2000 was Republican John M. Burris, who had barely survived a bitter September primary contest with retired judge William Swain Lee. Minner won easily. As the incumbent lieutenant governor, Minner took office upon the resignation of Governor Thomas R. Carper on January 3, 2001, after he was elected to a seat in the U.S. Senate. Upon completing the unexpired term, Minner began her first full term on January 16, 2001, and was elected to a second term in 2004. She served as the first female president of the Council of State Governments in 2005.

Minner was Delaware's fourth consecutive two-term governor and largely continued the business-oriented policies and bipartisan, consensus style begun by her Republican predecessor, Pierre S. du Pont IV. She was usually described as a "middle-of-the-road politician, with conservative fiscal views but progressive social policies." As governor, she worked to decrease cancer rates in Delaware, saying she "was determined to reduce Delaware's high cancer rates. A task force ... has created a road map of specific steps necessary ... and I am implementing that plan. [One] result has been ... the Clean Indoor Air Act, which has reduced cancerous pollutants in Delaware's restaurants, bars and casinos by more than 90 percent."

Regarding education, she said, "While it might be popular, it is not demanding to set standards that all students can meet right away ... Once high standards have been set, the key is to give our students, educators and parents the tools to continuously improve." She supported "giving local schools control of [most] new education dollars ... expanding after-school and weekend class programs ... and supports reading and math specialists." She opposed vouchers. "In 2005, she signed legislation creating the Student Excellence Equals Degree (SEED) Scholarship program, which enables students who keep their grades up and stay out of trouble to go to college for free in the state of Delaware. She also expanded her education specialist program, which has placed reading specialists in every elementary school, to also include a plan to place math specialists in every Delaware middle school."

On other issues she was "a firm supporter of a measure that would simply add sexual orientation to the list of characteristics in the Delaware code ... that are not allowed to be used as basis for discrimination." She opposed "new gun control legislation," but supported "legislation requiring mandatory trigger locks and gun safety courses in schools." And she said "I do not support additional sites or kinds of gambling ... the state should not become any more reliant on this form of revenue."

In her second inaugural address in January 2005, Minner concluded with this description of her philosophy: "for Ruth Ann Minner, farmer, gardener and daughter of a sharecropper, it is simply this: Work hard. Do the right thing. And leave things better than you found them."

Before she left office on January 20, 2009, longtime senator Joe Biden had resigned January 15, 2009, after winning a seventh term, to become Vice President. Minner appointed Biden’s former chief of staff, Ted Kaufman to Biden’s Senate seat.

Death
Minner died under hospice care in Milford on November 4, 2021, at age 86, after complications from a fall. She died about 6 months after former governor Pete du Pont died on May 18, 2021, of multiple long illnesses.

Election results

See also
List of female governors in the United States
List of female lieutenant governors in the United States

Notes

References

External links
Biographical Directory of the Governors of the United States
Delaware’s Governors 
The Political Graveyard 
 

|-

|-

|-

|-

1935 births
2021 deaths
20th-century American politicians
21st-century American politicians
Accidental deaths in Delaware
Accidental deaths from falls
Methodists from Delaware
Democratic Party Delaware state senators
Democratic Party governors of Delaware
Lieutenant Governors of Delaware
Democratic Party members of the Delaware House of Representatives
People from Milford, Delaware
Women state governors of the United States
Women state legislators in Delaware
21st-century American women politicians
20th-century American women politicians